James Edward Grant (May 25, 1924 – August 14, 1997) was an American painter and sculptor active from the late 1950s into the early 1970s. Best known for his sculptural work in plastics, this work by no means defined him, but was rather a natural endpoint of an exploration into increased dimensionality—starting from abstract canvases, moving through collages and bas-reliefs until the work finally came off the wall in sculptural form.

Life and work

Early life and education
Grant was born in Los Angeles in 1924. After receiving his undergraduate degree in Engineering from the University of Southern California, he went on to pursue his M.F.A. at the Jepson Art Institute in Los Angeles, studying under Rico Lebrun. In 1950 he accepted a teaching position at Pomona College in Claremont, California where he was Assistant Professor of Art for nine years. At about this time he married Nancy Parkford.  During his tenure at Pomona he worked with many influential artists and art historians, including painters Karl Benjamin and Frederick Hammersley, as well as Peter Selz (who later went on to become Chief Curator of Painting and Sculpture at the Museum of Modern Art, New York) and Seymour Slive (Director of the Fogg Art Museum, Harvard University).

Artistic career

While working in Southern California, Grant had solo exhibitions at the Pasadena Art Museum, Pomona College Museum of Art, and the University of California, Riverside, and group exhibitions at the Los Angeles County Museum of Art, the Oakland Museum of California, and the San Francisco Museum of Modern Art. After Pomona, Grant enjoyed a two-year stay in Rome where his paintings began to develop in texture—moving more towards collage work, using both paint and fabric. His stay was punctuated by a solo exhibition at the Galleria Pogliani in Rome.

Upon returning to the United States in 1962, Grant settled in San Francisco, where his collage work continued. In 1963 he had a solo exhibition at the M. H. de Young Memorial Museum. During the 1960s, he showed regularly at galleries and museums both in the Bay Area (Hansen Gallery) and New York (Bertha Schaefer Gallery and Grand Central Moderns).

In the mid 1960s, his collages began to include polyester resin which he applied in a painterly fashion to the canvas. Soon he began to cast the resin into large, textured bas-reliefs. His plastic work culminated in the development of large cast resin freestanding sculptures of geometric disks, tall spikes and subtly curved shapes which were highly polished. In 1970, he had a retrospective at Mills College in Oakland, California documenting his transition in style from abstract canvases to collages to bas-reliefs and finally the freestanding sculptures. In the 1970s, he worked on several commissioned works, many incorporating unique plastic and glass materials.

Later life and death

After a break from art during the late 1970s, Grant returned to painting in the early 1980s at his studio in Stinson Beach, California producing small watercolors that were cut into squares and reassembled into grids. He then took this format to a large scale, painting acrylic canvases which were also cut into squares and reassembled in works ranging from four to eight feet. This work continued into the 1990s.

Grant died in Stinson Beach in August 1997.  When the new Stinson Beach branch library opened in 1999, the opening show was of Grant's work. The art exhibit wall is named in his honor.

Exhibitions
Bold entries denote solo exhibitions.

 2008 de Saisset Museum, Santa Clara University, CA, Selections from the Anderson Collection: The 1960s
 2004 Crocker Art Museum, Sacramento, CA, San Francisco and the Second Wave: The Blair Collection of Abstract Expressionism
 1995 Triton Museum of Art, Santa Clara, CA, A Bay Area Connection: Works from the Anderson Collection
 1972 Triangle Gallery, San Francisco
 1971 University of Illinois, Champaign-Urbana, Contemporary American Painting and Sculpture
 1971 Stanford Art Gallery, Palo Alto, CA, West Coast Art 
 1971 Oakland Art Museum, Oakland, CA, Pierres de Fantasie
 1970 Mills College Art Gallery
 1970 Berkeley Art Gallery
 1970 Joslyn Art Museum, Omaha, NE, Looking West
 1969 Seligman Gallery, Seattle, WA
 1969 University of Illinois, Champaign-Urbana, Contemporary American Painting and Sculpture
 1969 Institute of Contemporary Art, University of Pennsylvania, PA, Plastics: New Art
 1968 Raymond College, University of the Pacific
 1968 Museum of Contemporary Crafts, New York, Plastic as Plastic
 1968 Hansen Gallery, San Francisco, CA, Recent Developments in Plastic
 1968 Crocker Art Gallery, Sacramento, CA, West Coast '68, Painters and  Sculptors
 1967 Hansen Gallery, San Francisco, CA, Plastics West Coast
 1967 University of Illinois, Champaign-Urbana, Contemporary American Painting and Sculpture
 1966 Hansen Gallery, San Francisco
 1966 Mead Corporation, Art Across America
 1966 Crocker Art Gallery, Sacramento, CA, ’66 Painters and Sculptors
 1966 San Francisco Museum of Art, San Francisco, CA, San Francisco Art Institute 85th Annual Exhibition
 1963 M.H. de Young Memorial Museum, San Francisco
 1963 Grand Central Moderns, New York
 1963 Mary Washington College of the University of Virginia
 1962 Galleria Pogliani, Rome
 1962 Art Center in La Jolla
 1961 Grand Central Moderns, New York
 1960 University of Nebraska, Nebraska Art Association Annual
 1959 Pasadena Art Museum, A Decade (1949–1959)
 1959 Bertha Schaefer Gallery, New York
 1958 Pomona College, Claremont, CA
 1958 University of California at Riverside
 1958 Humboldt State College
 1958 San Francisco Museum of Art, San Francisco, CA, San Francisco Art Institute 77th Annual Painting and Sculpture Exhibition
 1957 California State Fair and Exhibition
 1956 Pasadena Art Museum
 1956 Pomona Museum, Pomona, CA, Grant, Hammersley, Lawler
 1955 Los Angeles County Museum
 1954 Oakland Art Museum, Western Painters Annual Exhibition
 1954 Los Angeles County Museum

Public collections
 San Francisco Museum of Modern Art
 Oakland Museum
 Pasadena Museum
 Pomona College Museum of Art
 Claremont Museum of Art
 Mary Washington College of the University of Virginia
 Raymond College of the University of the Pacific
 City College of San Francisco

Bibliography

See also
Abstract expressionism

References

External links 
 James Grant web site
 James Grant biography, images and auction results on AskART

1924 births
1997 deaths
Artists from Los Angeles
USC Viterbi School of Engineering alumni
USC Roski School of Fine Arts alumni
People from Stinson Beach, California
Pomona College faculty